The Pratt Family Camps are a related collection of historic summer camps in Moultonborough, New Hampshire.

The camps were listed on the National Register of Historic Places in 2012.

See also

National Register of Historic Places listings in Carroll County, New Hampshire

References

Further reading

Historic districts on the National Register of Historic Places in New Hampshire
Geography of Carroll County, New Hampshire
National Register of Historic Places in Carroll County, New Hampshire
Moultonborough, New Hampshire